Deogyang-gu is a ward in Goyang, South Korea.

City information

The area is 165.49 km2 and the population is 385,387 (2008). It borders Jori-eup and Gwangtan-myeon of Paju-si to the north, Jangheung-myeon of Yangju-si and Dobong-gu and Eunpyeong-gu of Seoul to the east, Mapo-gu of Seoul and Gangseo-gu and Gochon-eup of Gimpo-si across the Han River to the south. The eastern part is a mountainous area centered on Mt. Bukhan, and most of the rest is a hilly mountainous area. A wide sedimentary plain developed around the Han River in the west and Gokneungcheon in the north, and the Changneungcheon in the south flows southwest and flows into the Han River.

Deokyang-gu is a district in the eastern part of Goyang-si, Gyeonggi-do. It is famous for its natural environment represented by Bukhansan Mountain and the Hangang River, as well as cultural assets such as the World Cultural Heritage Seosamneung and Seooreung, and Haengjusanseong Fortress. The name of the district is derived from 'Deokyang-hyeon', the old name of the Deokyang-gu area, and Haengjusanseong is located in Deokyangsan Mountain. Goyang City Hall is also located here.

Administration
Deogyang-gu is divided into 19 dong (동, "neighborhoods"):
 Jugyo-dong
 Seongsa 1 and 2 dong
 Wonsin-dong (combination from Wondang-dong and Sinwon-dong)
 Heungdo-dong (combination from Wonheung-dong and Donae-dong)
 Sindo-dong (divided into Samsong-dong and Ogeum-dong)
 Changneung-dong (divided into Dongsan-dong and Yongdu-dong)
 Hyoja-dong (divided into Hyoja-dong, Jichuk-dong and Bukhan-dong)
 Hwajeon-dong (divided into Hwajeon-dong, Deogeun-dong and Hyangdong-dong)
 Daedeok-dong (contain Hyeoncheon-dong)
 Haengsin 1 to 3 dong (Haengsin 2-dong [Gangmae-dong])
 Haengju-dong (divided into Haengjunae-dong, Haengjuoe-dong, Todang-dong and Daejang-dong)
 Neunggok-dong (divided into Naegok-dong and Sinpyeong-dong)
 Hwajeong 1 and 2 dong
 Gwansan-dong (divided into Gwansan-dong and Naeyu-dong)
 Goyang-dong (divided into Goyang-dong, Byeokje-dong, Daeja-dong and Seonyu-dong )

Incident

External links 
 Official Homepage 
 고양시청

Goyang
Districts in Gyeonggi Province